Pădureni (until 1965 Lighed; ; ;) is a commune in Timiș County, Romania. It is composed of a single village, Pădureni. It was part of Jebel commune before being split off in 2004.

Geography 
Pădureni is located about 18 km south of Timișoara, at the angle formed by the "dead" Timiș and the "flowing" Timiș. It borders Șag to the north, Liebling to the east, Jebel to the south and Parța to the northwest.

History 

The first recorded mention of Pădureni dates from 1332, under the name of Legvid. At the same time, there is a village called Mira (1310), now disappeared, which legend has it was destroyed in a Turkish raid. In an Ottoman defter, around 1590, the name of Ligit is also mentioned. After this moment no other data are known until 1761, when it appears again mentioned with the name Lighed or Temeslighed and a number of 312 houses. 

University professor Remus Crețan claims that today's locality was formed towards the end of the Turkish era, "on account of the Romanian and Turkish elements from Timiș meadow". According to historian , after the conquest of Banat by the Austrians, the locality was systematized by Count Mercy, from where until then the village was a "clog" on Trajan's Wall in the area called Iarc. It has been mostly Romanian ever since; the Romanian majority was preserved even during the periods of intense colonization of Banat.

Demographics 

Pădureni had a population of 1,938 inhabitants at the 2011 census, up 19% from the 2002 census. Most inhabitants are Romanians (93.09%), with a minority of Roma (1.14%). For 4.49% of the population, ethnicity is unknown. By religion, most inhabitants are Orthodox (89.16%), with a minority of Pentecostals (1.86%). For 5.88% of the population, religious affiliation is unknown.

Notes

References 

Communes in Timiș County
Localities in Romanian Banat